Init sa Magdamag (International title: When Love Burns / ) is a 2021 Philippine television drama romance series broadcast by Kapamilya Channel. Directed by Raymund B. Ocampo, it stars Gerald Anderson, Yam Concepcion and JM de Guzman. The series premiered on network's Primetime Bida evening block, A2Z, TV5 and worldwide via The Filipino Channel from April 19 to September 10, 2021, on Monday to Friday at 9:25 PM, replacing Walang Hanggang Paalam and was replaced by Marry Me, Marry You.

Plot 
The story revolves around Tupe, Rita, and Peterson — and their love triangle marred with political drama and clashing dreams.

An aspiring doctor, Tupe gets falsely accused as being involved in the corrupt activities of his government official associated father, wrecking his relationship with Rita. Years after Tupe’s apparent disappearance, Rita finds a new love in Peterson, who credits her for becoming a changed man as he pursues political office.

Rita and Peterson’s relationship began to deteriorate after Peterson was rendered impotent due to a car accident. Believing that having a child will revive their failing marriage, Rita and Peterson decided to hire a sperm donor — in the form of Tupe, who is now a resident barrio doctor. Unbeknownst to Peterson, Tupe is Rita’s greatest love. Complications will soon arise when Peterson unravels that truth behind Rita and Tupe's past, igniting his rage.

Cast and characters 

Main cast
 Gerald Anderson as Dr. Christopher "Tupe" Salcedo
 Yam Concepcion as Cong. Rita Macatangay-Alvarez / Rita Macatangay-Salcedo
 JM de Guzman as Peterson Alvarez

Supporting cast
 Tetchie Agbayani as Olivia Alvarez
 Rez Cortez as Victor Ruiz
 Aleck Bovick as Celia Macatangay   
 Mica Javier as Paulina Vergara
 Alexa Ilacad as Hannah Salcedo
Boom Labrusca as Lav Del Mundo
 Gab Lagman as Kiko Del Mundo
 Mark Oblea as Khyle Macatangay
 Albie Casiño as Raymund

Extended cast
 Angie Castrence as Manang Lily
 Lotlot Bustamante as Kapitana Apple
 Ayla Mendero as Limei
 Dolly De Leon as Perla
 Rafa Siguion-Reyna as Atty. Paolo
 Ali Khatibi as Cong. Regalado
 Hannah Ledesma as Melai
 Apey Obera as Michelle
 Benedict Campos as Bryan
 Brian Sy as Atty. Eli
 Lance Justin Carr as Jack
 Franco Daza as Kenneth
 Mabel Reyes as Fely
 Nico Gomez Alonso as Dr. Adrian
 Mark Rivera as Emman

Guest cast
 Joey Marquez as Engr. Miguel Salcedo
 Lovely Rivero as Helen Salcedo

Production

Casting 
Maja Salvador was originally cast to play the titular role with the working title Ligaya back in 2018 but she turned down the role because of its  infidelity-themed concept similar with her previous teleserye, The Legal Wife, and also out of consideration for her current boyfriend. Yam Concepcion took over the role.

Re-run 
Init sa Magdamag re-aired on Kapamilya Channel's Kapamilya Gold afternoon block and A2Z on March 28 to August 26, 2022, replacing the reruns of Love Thy Woman and was replaced by the reruns of Bagani.

See also 
 List of programs broadcast by Kapamilya Channel
 List of programs broadcast by Kapamilya Online Live
 List of programs broadcast by A2Z (Philippine TV channel)
 List of programs broadcast by TV5 (Philippine TV network)
 List of programs broadcast by ABS-CBN
 List of programs broadcast by Jeepney TV
 List of ABS-CBN drama series

Notes

References

External links 
 

ABS-CBN drama series
Philippine melodrama television series
Philippine romance television series
2021 Philippine television series debuts
2021 Philippine television series endings
Filipino-language television shows
Television shows set in the Philippines
Television series by Star Creatives